James William Van Der Beek (born March 8, 1977) is an American actor best known for his portrayal of Dawson Leery in the WB series Dawson's Creek and Johnny "Mox" Moxon in Varsity Blues (1999). He played a fictionalized version of himself on the cult ABC sitcom Don't Trust the B---- in Apartment 23, starred in CSI: Cyber as FBI Special Agent Elijah Mundo, and as Matt Bromley on the FX drama Pose.

Early life and stage career
Van Der Beek was born in Cheshire, New Haven County, Connecticut, son of Melinda (née Weber) (1950-2020), a former dancer and gymnastics teacher, and husband James William Van Der Beek, a cellular phone company executive and former professional baseball pitcher. He is partly of Dutch ancestry; his last name translates to "from the creek".

Van Der Beek played the role of Reuben in his middle school production of Joseph and the Amazing Technicolor Dreamcoat.  At the age of 15, he asked his mother to take him into New York City to get an agent and try his hand in professional acting. He made his professional debut off-Broadway at age 16 in 1993 in the New York premiere of Edward Albee's play Finding the Sun with the Signature Theatre Company. He played the role of "Fergus". Both he and the production, which was also directed by Albee, received positive reviews. A decade later, in 2003, he appeared again off-Broadway, briefly, in the play Rain Dance.

Aged 17, while still in high school at Cheshire Academy, he performed in the musical Shenandoah at the Goodspeed Opera House, and made his feature film debut as a sadistic bully in Angus (1995) and shot a small role in the independent film I Love You, I Love You Not (1996).

He attended Drew University, on an academic scholarship, where he participated in an all-male a cappella group, but dropped out once Dawson's Creek was picked up to series. He performed at the Vineyard Theater in New York in Nicky Silver's play, My Marriage to Ernest Borgnine, and he played a supporting role in the independent film Cash Crop, which was originally shot in spring of 1997 and originally titled Harvest until released in 2001.

Television and film career
In early 1997, Van Der Beek auditioned for three television pilots. One of them was for the fledgling WB Network show Dawson's Creek. Van Der Beek won the title role of Dawson Leery, and the show's 1998 debut was a success that helped to establish the network and its cast. The series ran for six seasons and was syndicated worldwide. In 1999, he starred in the teen football drama Varsity Blues, which held the number 1 spot at the U.S. box office for its first two weeks. He won an MTV Movie Award for his role.

Around this time he was selected one of People magazine's "50 Most Beautiful People in the World", and he appeared in several other films, including Texas Rangers, Scary Movie, and Jay & Silent Bob Strike Back, playing himself playing Jay in the film within the film opposite Jason Biggs as Silent Bob. In 2002, he played Sean Bateman (younger brother of American Psycho protagonist Patrick Bateman) in the film adaptation of the novel The Rules of Attraction by Bret Easton Ellis, written and directed by Roger Avary. The film was an initial box office failure, but found a cult following on DVD.

In 2006, he appeared on the Direct-to-DVD thriller The Plague, which was produced by Clive Barker and was panned by critics. After Dawson's Creek ended in 2003, he returned to off-Broadway, in Lanford Wilson's Rain Dance. He completed an unproduced screenplay titled Winning. Since then, he made a few appearances on television, including a role on Ugly Betty. In 2007, he guest-starred in a two-part episode of the series Criminal Minds, playing a serial killer with dissociative identity disorder called Tobias Hankel who kidnaps and drugs one of the main characters, Spencer Reid. In 2008, he made a guest appearance on How I Met Your Mother, in which he played Simon, one of Robin Scherbatsky’s early boyfriends, multiple times.

In 2008, he began a recurring role on One Tree Hill as a filmmaker who was largely the satirical opposite of Dawson Leery. He appeared in an episode of the fifth season of Medium. In 2009, he portrayed real life kidnapper Anthony Steven "Tony Zappa" Wright in the Lifetime network television film Taken In Broad Daylight. In 2009, he won Best Actor at the 8th Annual San Diego Film Festival for his portrayal of FBI agent Jake Kelly working in Taiwan in the political thriller Formosa Betrayed, which also won Best Picture. The film was distributed theatrically in the United States starting February 26, 2010.

On January 5, 2010, TVGuide.com confirmed that Van Der Beek had been cast in a major recurring role on the television series Mercy. He played Dr. Joe Briggs, the new womanizing ICU chief who harbors a dark secret. He starred alongside Rhona Mitra, Josh Lucas, and Jon Hamm in the Anders Anderson thriller film Stolen.

In 2011, he portrayed Kesha's nemesis in her music video for "Blow". He portrayed a fictionalized version of himself on the television series  Don't Trust the B---- in Apartment 23. The show debuted to critical praise, with Van Der Beek earning particularly good notices for his comic timing and sendup of his own image. The show was cancelled after two seasons, but remains popular on Netflix and on Logo TV which picked it up in syndication.

On March 4, 2015, he began his role as Senior Field Agent Elijah Mundo on CSI: Cyber. In 2017, Van Der Beek appeared in the British comedy series Carters Get Rich. He made a cameo in the film Downsizing (2017), starring Matt Damon, and voices Boris Hauntley in the Disney Junior show Vampirina.

As a writer, Van Der Beek co-created, wrote, produced and starred in What Would Diplo Do?, in which he portrays producer and DJ Diplo. It was Van Der Beek's first foray as show runner of a series. The show debuted on Viceland to positive reviews, both for the writing and Van Der Beek's performance, was called, “The Veep of DJ Culture” by the L.A. Times and scored 90% on Rotten Tomatoes

In 2019 Van Der Beek was cast in the Emmy-nominated Pose as Matt Bromley  on FX, a role he played for one season.

Van Der Beek joined the cast of the 28th season of Dancing with the Stars. He was paired with professional dancer Emma Slater. A surprisingly good dancer, Van Der Beek was consistently scored in the top spot and favored to win until he was eliminated in the semi-finals, finishing in fifth place. That night, he revealed that his wife, Kimberly, had suffered a miscarriage forty-eight hours prior. The judges scored him lowest, and then, in a decision that was controversial with fans, sent him home.

Personal life

First marriage
Van Der Beek was previously married to actress Heather Ann McComb from 2003 until their separation in April 2009. Van Der Beek filed for divorce in the fall of that year, which was finalized and enforced in spring 2010.

Second marriage
Van Der Beek married business consultant Kimberly Brook on August 1, 2010, in a small ceremony at the Kabbalah Center near Dizengoff Plaza in Tel Aviv, Israel. The couple have six children: Olivia (born September 25, 2010), Joshua (born March 13, 2012), Annabel (born January 25, 2014), Emilia (born March 23, 2016), and Gwendolyn (born June 15, 2018). They announced in October 2019 that they were expecting their sixth child. In November 2019, it was revealed that Van Der Beek's wife, Kimberly, had suffered a miscarriage. In September 2020, they announced that they were leaving Los Angeles and moving to Texas. On November 22, 2021, he posted on TikTok and Instagram the welcoming of his 6th child Jeremiah, who was born 5 weeks earlier. He said after two 17+ week losses, they kept the pregnancy quiet.

Filmography

Television

Film

Awards and nominations
MTV Movie Awards

|-
||1999
|| Varsity Blues
|Best Breakthrough Male Performance
|
|-
|2001
|Scary Movie 
|Best Cameo in a Movie
|
|}

Teen Choice Awards

|-
|rowspan="2"|1999
|| Dawson's Creek
|Choice TV Actor
|
|-
|| Varsity Blues
|Choice Movie Breakout Star
|
|-
|2012
|Don't Trust the B in Apt 23
|Choice TV: Male Scene Stealer
|
|}

Blockbuster Entertainment Awards

|-
|2000
| Varsity Blues
|Favorite Actor – Newcomer (Internet Only)
|
|}

San Diego Film Festival

|-
|2009
| Formosa Betrayed
|Best Actor 
|
|}

NewNowNext Awards

|-
|2011
| JamesVanDerMemes.com
|OMG Internet Award
|
|}

References

External links

 
 
 

1977 births
20th-century American male actors
21st-century American male actors
American people of Dutch descent
American male child actors
American male film actors
American male stage actors
American male television actors
Drew University alumni
Living people
Male actors from Connecticut
People from Cheshire, Connecticut
American male web series actors
Streamy Award winners
Cheshire Academy alumni